Estadio Universidad del Mar is the main tennis court in La Serena, Chile.  Built in 2007, it currently holds 10,000 spectators.  It hosts the La Serena Open on the ATP Challenger Series as well as Davis Cup matches.

External links
La Serena Open website
Picture of stadium

Sports venues completed in 2007
Tennis venues in Chile
Sports venues in Coquimbo Region